Brimsdown Hill is a 193.7 hectare biological Site of Special Scientific Interest in Wiltshire, notified in 1951. It is situated within the Cranborne Chase and West Wiltshire Downs Area of Outstanding Natural Beauty.j,

See also
Long Knoll
Heath Hill Farm

Sources
 Natural England citation sheet for the site (accessed 22 March 2022)

External links
 Natural England website (SSSI information)

Sites of Special Scientific Interest in Wiltshire
Sites of Special Scientific Interest notified in 1951
Hills of Wiltshire